The copper seedeater (Sporophila bouvreuil) is a species of bird in the family Thraupidae.  It was lumped with the pearly-bellied seedeater, (S. pileata) and known together as the capped seedeater before being split in February 2012.

It is found Brazil and Suriname. Its natural habitat is dry savanna.

References

 

Machado, E. & Silveira, L.F. (2010) Geographical and seasonal distribution of the Seedeaters Sporophila bouvreuil and Sporophila pileata (Aves: Emberizidae). Papéis Avulsos de Zoologia, 50 (32):517-533.
Machado, E. & Silveira, L.F. (2011) Plumage variability and taxonomy of the Capped Seedeater Sporophila bouvreuil (Aves: Passeriformes: Emberizidae). Zootaxa, 2781: 49–62.

copper seedeater
Birds of Brazil
copper seedeater
Birds of the Amazon Basin
Taxonomy articles created by Polbot